Colour Collection may refer to:

 Colour Collection (Frank Duval album), 2006
 Colour Collection (Grace Jones album), 2006